Little Bird is a Canadian drama television series, slated to premiere on Crave and APTN lumi in the 2022-23 television season. Created by Jennifer Podemski and Hannah Moscovitch with the participation of Jeremy Podeswa as an executive producer, the series will centre on a First Nations woman who was adopted into a Jewish family during the Sixties Scoop, as she attempts to reconnect with her birth family and heritage.

The series will star Darla Contois as Esther Rosenblum/Bezhig Little Bird, alongside Ellyn Jade, Osawa Muskwa, Joshua Odjick, Imajyn Cardinal, Mathew Strongeagle, Eric Schweig and Michelle Thrush in supporting roles, with episodes directed by Elle-Máijá Tailfeathers and Zoe Hopkins.

The series was created concurrently with, but separately from, the drama series Unsettled.

The series, the first original drama series to be commissioned by Crave since its rebranding from The Movie Network in 2018, will be distributed by both Crave, APTN, and APTN Lumi.

References

External links 
 

Upcoming drama television series
2020s Canadian drama television series
Crave original programming
First Nations television series